The Roman Catholic Suburbicarian Diocese of Palestrina is a Roman Catholic suburbicarian diocese centered on the comune of Palestrina in Italy.

The current bishop of Palestrina is Domenico Sigalini, who from 3 November 2010 until 5 April 2014 was also appointed by Pope Benedict XVI to be the general ecclesiastical assistant of Italian Catholic Action.

History

Palestrina was looted in 1473.

During the 17th century, the comune of Palestrina was the family territory of a number of Italian noble families including the Barberini, Colonna and d'Este families (which regularly intermarried). Members of these families are represented throughout the list of diocese Bishops, especially between 1600 and 1800. Barberini Pope Urban VIII appointed a number of relatives and close supporters to the Palestrina diocese and governmental positions.

Bishops

To 1000
Maurus (558)
Sergio (721)
Venanzio 732
Gregorio 761–767
Andrea 769–773
Contantinus 826
Leone 914–928
Teofilo 963 – before 988
Stefan 988
Peter 996–1015

1001–1200
Johannes I 1036–1039
Johannes II 1044
Raniero 1058 (pseudocardinal, created by antipope *?)
Bruno 1059–1060
Bernhard 1061–1065
Loperto 1066–1069
vacant 1069–1073
Uberto Belmonte 1073–1082
[Berardo (?) ca.1092 (?)]
Ugone Candido 1089–1099 (pseudocardinal)
Milone 1095/98–1104
vacant 1104–1107
Cuno of Praeneste 1107–1122
Guillaume Praenestinus 1123–1137
Johannes 1130–1134 (pseudocardinal)
Étienne de Châlons 1139–1144
Guarino Foscari 1144–1158
Giulio I 1158–1164
vacant 1164–1176
Vibiano 1168–1173 (pseudocardinal)
Manfredo de Lavagna 1176–1178
vacant 1178–1179
Benerede 1179–1180
Paolo Scolari 1180–1187
vacant 1188–1191
Giovanni III da Anagni 1190–1196
vacant 1196–1200
Guy de Paré, O.Cist. 1200–1204

1201–1400

Guido Papareschi 1206–1221
Guido II Pierleoni 1221–1228
Giacomo di Pecorari, O.Cist.  1231–1244
Stephen Báncsa 1251–1270
Vicedominus de Vicedominis 1273–1276
Erard de Lézinnes 1278–1279
Girolamo I Masci 1281–1288, later Pope Nicholas IV
Bernardo V Berardi di Cagli 1288–1291
Simon I Beaulieu 1294–1297
Teodorico Raineri 1299–1306
Pierre III de la Chapelle Taillefer 1306–1312
Guillaume II de Mandagot 1312–1321
Pierre IV Despres 1322–1361 (Pierre des Prés, Peter de Pratis)
Raymond de Canillac 1361–1373
Simon Langham 1373–1376
Jean du Cros 1377–1378  (in the obedience of Avignon until 1383)
Francesco Moricotti Prignani 1380–1394 (Roman Obedience)
Gui de Malsec 1384–1412 (Avignon Obedience)
Angelo Afflicti 1395–1401 (administrator) (Roman Obedience)

1401–1600

Oddo Colonna 1401–1405 (administrator)
Antonio I Gaetani 1405–1409, † 1412 (Bishop of Porto 1409–1412)
Angelo de Sommariva,O.S.B.Cam. 1412–1428
vacant 1428–1431
Hugues de Lusignan 1431–1436, † 1442 (Bishop of Frascati 1436–1442)
vacant 1436–1444
Giovanni IV Tagliacotio 1444–1449
Giorgio de Flisco 1449–1455
vacant 1455–1460
Juan de Torquemada 1460–1463, † 1468 (Bishop of Albano c. 1464 and Bishop of Sabina 1463–1468)
vacant 1463–1465
Alain de Cotivy 1465–1472, † 1474 (also Bishop of Sabina 1472–1474)
Angelo Capranica 1472–1478
Marco Balbo 1478–1491
Jean Balue 1491 (Bishop of Albano 1483–1491)
Giovanni VII Micheli 1491–1492, † 1503 (Bishop of Albano 1491, Bishop of Porto 1492–1503)
Girolamo  Basso della Rovere 1492–1503, † 1507 (Bishop of Sabina 1503–1507)
Lorenzo Cybo de Mari 1503 (Bishop of Albano 1501–1503, Bishop of Frascati 1503)
Antonio Pallavicino 1503–1507 (Bishop of Frascati 1503–1505)
Giovanni Antonio Sangiorgio 1507–1508, † 1509 (Bishop of Frascati 1505–1507, Bishop of Sabina 1508–1509)
Bernardino Lopez de Carvajal 1508–1509 (Bishop of Frascati 1507–1509, of Sabina 1509–1521 and of Ostia and Velletri 1521–1523)
Guillaume Briçonnet 1509–1511 (Bishop of Albano 1507–1508 and of Frascati 1509–1510)
Marco Vigerio, O.Min. 1511–1516.
Francesco II Soderini 1516–1523 (Bishop of Albano 1516–1517, of Porto 1523 and of Ostia and Velletri 1523–1524)
Alessandro Farnese 1523
Antonio Maria Ciocchi del Monte 1523–1524 (Bishop of Albano 1521–1523 and of Sabina 1524)
Pietro Accolti 1524, † 1532 (Bishop of Albano 1623–1524 and of Sabina 1524–1532)
Marco Cornaro 1524
Lorenzo Pucci 1524–1531 (Bishop of Albano 1524)
Giovanni Piccolomini 1531–1533, † 1537 (Bishop of Albano 1524–1531, of Porto 1533–1535 and of Ostia and Velletri 1535–1537)
Andrea della Valle 1533–1534 (Bishop of Albano 1533)
Bonifacio Ferreri 1534–1535, † 1543
Lorenzo Campeggio 1535–1537, † 1539 (Bishop of Albano 1534–1535 and of Sabina 1537–1539)
Antonio Sanseverino 1537–1539, † 1543 (Bishop of Sabina 1539–1543 and of Porto 1543)
Giovanni Vincenzo Caraffa 1539–1541
Alessandro  Cesarini 1541–1542
Francesco III Cornaro 1542–1543
Giovanni Maria Ciocchi del Monte 1543–1550
François Louis de Bourbon de Vendôme 1550–1557
Federigo Cesi 1557–1562, † 1564
Giovanni Morone 1562–1564, † 1580 (Bishop of Albano 1560–1561, of Sabina 1561–1562, of Frascati 1562, 1564–1565, of Porto 1565–1570 and of Ostia and Velletri 1570–1580)
Cristoforo Madruzzo 1564–1570, † 1578 (Bishop of Albano 1561–1562, of Sabina 1562–1564 and of Porto 1570–1578)
Otto Truchsess von Waldburg 1570–1573 (Bishop of Albano 1562–1570 and Sabina 1570)
Giulio della Rovere 1573–1578 (Bishop of Albano 1570 and of Sabina 1570–1573)
Giovanni Antonio Serbelloni 1578–1583, † 1591 (Bishop of Frascati 1583–1587, of Sabina 1578, of Porto 1587–1589 and of Ostia and Velletri 1589–1591)
Giovanni Francesco Gambara 1583–1587 (Bishop of Albano 1580–1583)
Marco Antonio Colonna 1587–1597
Giulio Antonio Santori 1597–1602

1601–1800

Alessandro Ottaviano de' Medici 1602–1605 (Bishop of Albano 1600–1602)
Agostino Valeri 1605–1606
Ascanio Colonna 1606–1608
Antonio Maria Galli 1608–1611, 20 (Bishop of Frascati 1605–1608, of Porto 1611–1615 and of Ostia and Velletri 1615–1620)
Gregorio Petrocchini 1611–1612
Benedetto Giustiniani 1612–1615, (Bishop of Sabina 1615–1620 and of Porto 1620–1621)
Francesco Maria Del Monte 1615–1621, (Bishop of Porto 1621–1623 and of Ostia and Velletri 1623–1625)
Ottavio Bandini 1621–1624, (Bishop of Porto 1624–1626 and of Ostia and Velletri 1626–1629)
Andrea Baroni Peretti Montalto 1624–1626, (Bishop of Albano 1626–1627 and of Frascati 1627–1629)
Domenico Ginnasi 1626–1629, (Bishop of Porto 1629–1630 and of Ostia 1630–1639)
Marcello Lante della Rovere 1629, (Bishop of Frascati 1629–1639, of Porto 1639–1641 and of Ostia 1641–1652)
Pier Paolo Crescenzi 1629–1641, † 1645 (Bishop of Porto 1641–1645)
Guido Bentivoglio 1641–1644
Alfonso de la Cueva Albuquerque 1644–1655
Bernardino Spada 1655–1661 (Bishop of Albano 1646–1652, of Frascati 1652 and of Sabina 1652–1655)
Antonio Barberini 1661–1671 (Bishop of Frascati 1655–1661)
Rinaldo d'Este 1671–1672
Cesare Facchinetti 1672–1679, † 1683 (Bishop of Porto 1679–1680 and of Ostia and Velletri 1680–1683)
Alderano Cybo 1679–1680, † 1700 (Bishop of Frascati 1680–1683, of Porto 1683–1687 and of Ostia and Velletri 1687–1700)
Lorenzo Raggi 1680–1687
Antonio  Bichi 1687–1691
Paluzzo Paluzzi Altieri degli Albertoni 1691–1698 (Bishop of Sabina 1689–1691)
Luis Manuel Fernando Portocarrero 1698–1709
Fabrizio Spada 1710–1717
Francesco del Giudice 1717–1721 
Francesco Barberini 1721–1726, (Bishop of Ostia and Velletri 1726–1738)
Tommaso Ruffo 1726–1738, † 1753 (Bishop of Porto 1738–1740 and of Ostia and Velletri 1740–1753)
 Giorgio Spinola 1738–1739
Giovanni Battista Altieri (iuniore) 1739–1740
 Vincenzo  Petra 1740–1747
Antonio Xaverio Gentilis 1747–1753
Giuseppe Spinelli 1753–1759, † 1763 (Bishop of Porto 1759–1761 and of Ostia and Velletri 1761–1763)
Federico Marcello Lante 1759–1763, † 1773 (Bishop of Porto 1763–1773)
Giovanni Francesco II Stoppani 1763–1774
Girolamo III Spinola 1775–1784
Marcantonio Colonna (iuniore) 1784–1793
Leonardo Antonelli 1794–1800, † 1811 (Bishop of Porto 1800–1807 and of Ostia and Velletri 1807–1811)
Alessandro Mattei 1800–1809, † 1820 (Bishop of Porto 1809–1814 and of Ostia and Velletri 1814–1820)

1801–2000
Aurelio Roverella 1809–1812
Diego Inigo Caracciolo di Martini 1814–1820
Giuseppe Spina 1820–1828
Francesco Bertazzoli 1828–1830
Carlo Maria Pedicini 1830–1840, † 1843 (Bishop of Porto 1840–1843)
Vincenzo Macchi 1840–1844, † 1860 (Bishop of Porto 1844–1847 and of Ostia and Velletri 1847–1860)
Castruccio Castracane degli Anteliminelli 1844–1852
Luigi Amato di San Filippo e Sorso 1852–1870, † 1877–1878 (Bishop of Porto 1871–1877, and of Ostia and Velletri 1877–1878)
Carlo Sacconi 1870–1878, † 1889 (Bishop of Porto 1878–1884 and of Ostia and Velletri 1884–1889)
Antonino de Luca 1878–1883
Luigi Oreglia di Santo Stefano 1884–1889, † 1913 (Bishop of Porto 1889–1896 and of Ostia and Velletri 1896–1913)
Angelo Bianchi 1889–1897
Camillo Mazzella 1897–1900
Vincenzo Vannutelli 1900–1930 (Bishop of Ostia 1915–1930)
Luigi Sincero 1933–1936
Angelo Dolci 1936–1939
Carlo Salotti 1939–1947
Benedetto Aloisi Masella 1948–1970
Carlo Confalonieri 1972–1986 (Bishop of Ostia 1977–1986)
Bernardin Gantin 1986–2008 (Bishop of Ostia 1993–2002)

From 2001
José Saraiva Martins (2009–current)

Post 1960

Like all dioceses in this category, for historical reasons it has had, since 1960, an incumbent diocesan bishop with ordinary powers but also has assigned to it as an honorary high ranking dignity one of the six cardinals in the Order of Cardinal Bishops. The Cardinal Bishop has no powers with regard to the government of the diocese.

The diocesan bishops have been:

Pietro Severi (1966–1975)
Renato Spallanzani (1975–1986)
Pietro Garlato (1986–1991) 
Vittorio Tomassetti (1992–1997)
Eduardo Davino (1997–2005)
Domenico Sigalini (2005–current)

References

Bibliography

Brixius, Johannes M. Die Mitglieder des Kardinalskollegiums von 1130-1181, Berlin 1912.
 (in Latin)
  (in Latin)
 p. 80.  (in Latin)
Gams, Pius B.  Series episcoporum Ecclesiae catholicae, Leipzig 1931.
 (in Latin)
Hüls, Rudolf.  Kardinäle, Klerus und Kirchen Roms: 1049–1130, Bibliothek des Deutschen Historischen Instituts in Rom 1977. 

Klewitz, Hans-Walter.  Reformpapsttum und Kardinalkolleg, Darmstadt 1957. 

Maleczek, Werner. Papst und Kardinalskolleg von 1191 bis 1216, Vienna 1984. 
 (in Latin)
 (in Latin)

External links
Suburbicarian Diocese of Palestrina Official Website

 
Suburbicarian dioceses
Roman Catholic bishops in Italy by diocese
Palestrina